William Russell (1782September 28, 1845) was a United States Representative from Ohio.

Early life and career
Born in the Kingdom of Ireland in 1782, Russell immigrated to the United States and settled in West Union, Ohio. He received a limited schooling and later in life held several local offices. He first served in the Ohio House of Representatives in 1803.

In 1808 Russell married Nancy Wood. They had six sons and one daughter, and eventually settled in Portsmouth, Ohio.

Ohio congressman and senator
Russell was elected in December 1809 to fill a vacancy caused by Ohio Congressman Alexander Campbell's resignation. He served in that same capacity again from 1811 to 1813.  Russell held a seat in the Ohio Senate from 1819 to 1821.

US House
Russell was elected (as a Jacksonian) to the Twentieth, Twenty-first, and Twenty-second Congresses (March 4, 1827 – March 3, 1833). His reelection bid for the Twenty-third Congress in 1832 was unsuccessful.

Russell was elected (as a Whig) to the Twenty-seventh Congress (March 4, 1841 – March 3, 1843). He did not run for reelection in 1842.

Retirement and death
Russell retired to his farm along the Little Scioto River, where he died September 28, 1845.  He was interred in the old section of Rushtown Cemetery, in Rushtown, Ohio.

References

External links

1782 births
1845 deaths
Members of the Ohio House of Representatives
Ohio state senators
People from West Union, Ohio
People from Portsmouth, Ohio
Irish emigrants to the United States (before 1923)
Jacksonian members of the United States House of Representatives from Ohio
Whig Party members of the United States House of Representatives from Ohio
19th-century American politicians
Burials in Ohio